The 2015–16 Duquesne Dukes men's basketball team represented Duquesne University during the 2015–16 NCAA Division I men's basketball season. The Dukes, led by fourth year head coach Jim Ferry, played their home games at the A. J. Palumbo Center and were members of the Atlantic 10 Conference. They finished the season 17–17, 6–12 in A-10 play to finish in a tie for tenth place. They lost to La Salle in the first round of the A-10 tournament. The Dukes were invited to the College Basketball Invitational where they defeated Nebraska–Omaha in the first round before losing in the quarterfinals to Morehead State.

Previous season
The Dukes finish the 2014–15 season 12–19, 6–12 in A-10 play to finish in eleventh place. They advanced to the second round of the A-10 tournament where they lost to George Washington.

Departures

Incoming transfers

Incoming recruits

Roster

Schedule

|-
!colspan=9 style="background:#00214D; color:#CC0000;"| Exhibition

|-
!colspan=9 style="background:#00214D; color:#CC0000;"| Non-conference regular season

|-
!colspan=9 style="background:#00214D; color:#CC0000;"| Atlantic 10 regular season

|-
!colspan=9 style="background:#00214D; color:#CC0000;"| Atlantic 10 tournament

|-
!colspan=9 style="background:#00214D; color:#CC0000;"| CBI

See also
2015–16 Duquesne Dukes women's basketball team

References

Duquesne
Duquesne Dukes men's basketball seasons
Duquesne
2015 in sports in Pennsylvania
2016 in sports in Pennsylvania